Helicigona lapicida is a species of medium-sized, air-breathing land snail, a terrestrial pulmonate gastropod mollusk in the family Helicidae, the typical snails. 

Subspecies
 Helicigona lapicida andorrica (Bourguignat, 1876)
 Helicigona lapicida lapicida (Linnaeus, 1758)

Anatomy

This species of snail makes and uses love darts during mating.

Distribution 
This species is native to Europe, especially Central Europe.

Shell description 

The shell of this species is approximately 20 mm in maximum dimension. The periphery of the shell is sharply keeled. There is a wide umbilicus. The peristome around the aperture is white and strongly reflected and lipped.
The shell color is grey-brown with some red brown patches.

References 

 Janus, Horst, 1965. The young specialist looks at land and freshwater molluscs, Burke, London
 Kerney, M.P., Cameron, R.A.D. & Jungbluth, J-H. (1983). Die Landschnecken Nord- und Mitteleuropas. Ein Bestimmungsbuch für Biologen und Naturfreunde, 384 pp., 24 plates. [Summer or later]. Hamburg / Berlin (Paul Parey).
 Bank, R. A.; Neubert, E. (2017). Checklist of the land and freshwater Gastropoda of Europe. Last update: July 16th, 2017
 Sysoev, A. V. & Schileyko, A. A. (2009). Land snails and slugs of Russia and adjacent countries. Sofia/Moskva (Pensoft). 312 pp., 142 plates.

External links
 innaeus, C. (1758). Systema Naturae per regna tria naturae, secundum classes, ordines, genera, species, cum characteribus, differentiis, synonymis, locis. Editio decima, reformata [10th revised edition, vol. 1: 824 pp. Laurentius Salvius: Holmiae.]
Helicigona lapicida at Animalbase taxonomy,short description, distribution, biology,status (threats), images
  Helicigona lapicida  images at Encyclopedia of Life
Fauna Europaea Search Distribution

Helicidae
Gastropods described in 1758
Taxa named by Carl Linnaeus